Jodie Lee Ann Sweetin (born January 19, 1982)  is an American actress and television personality. She is best known for her role as Stephanie Tanner in the ABC comedy series Full House and its Netflix sequel series Fuller House.

Early life and career
Sweetin was born in Los Angeles, California. Her parents were both in prison at the time, and she was adopted and raised as an only child by her uncle Sam Sweetin and his second wife Janice when she was nine months old. Years later, she said she was told not to talk about her adoption publicly out of fear that people would think she was forced into acting.

After appearing in several national commercials, she was cast in a guest role in the 1987 sitcom Valerie as Pamela, the niece of Mrs. Poole (Edie McClurg). Jeff Franklin cast her as Stephanie Tanner in the ABC comedy series Full House, and she played that role until the show ended in 1995. This has become her most famous role to date. 

In 1999, four years after Full House ended, Sweetin graduated from Los Alamitos High School in Los Alamitos, California, and attended Chapman University in Orange, California. While in high school, Sweetin and fellow actor Matthew Morrison performed in musical theater together.

Sweetin returned to television by hosting the second season of the Fuse dance competition show Pants-Off Dance-Off. She starred in the television pilot, Small Bits of Happiness, a dark comedy centered around a suicide prevention specialist; it won Best Comedy at the 3rd Annual Independent Television Festival, in Los Angeles. In 2009, Sweetin focused on independent films and appeared in two films: Port City and Redefining Love. In 2011, she appeared in five web episodes in the Internet show Can't Get Arrested. In 2012, she appeared as Leia in the television film Singled Out.

In 2015, it was announced Sweetin would reprise her role as Stephanie Tanner on the Netflix spin-off series Fuller House, which ended after five seasons in 2020. On April 12, 2017, she starred in Hollywood Darlings, an unscripted docu-comedy series for Pop where she plays an exaggerated version of herself.

In 2019, Sweetin started a podcast called Never Thought I'd Say This on parenting alongside Celia Behar, a licensed mental health counselor, and Sweetin's best friend.

In 2022, Sweetin competed on CBS's Beyond the Edge, the seventh celebrity edition of Food Network's Worst Cooks in America, That's So90s, and the second season of FOX's Name That Tune.

Dancing with the Stars
On March 2, 2016, Sweetin was announced as one of the celebrities to compete on Dancing with the Stars for season 22. Her professional dance partner was Keo Motsepe. Sweetin and Motsepe were eliminated on week eight of competition and finished in sixth place.

Personal life

As a child, Sweetin took dance lessons. She studied ballet and tap dancing when she was three years old. In 2002, at age 20, Sweetin married her first husband, Los Angeles Police officer Shaun Holguin. Fellow Full House castmate Candace Cameron served as her matron of honor; Cameron's daughter, Natasha, served as a flower girl. Sweetin and Holguin divorced in 2006.

Sweetin met Cody Herpin, a film transportation coordinator, through friends, and they started dating in May 2007. They were married in Las Vegas, Nevada on July 14, 2007. Together they have one daughter, Zoie (born 2008). On November 19, 2008, Sweetin filed for legal separation from Herpin. Their divorce was finalized on April 20, 2010.

On April 30, 2010, Sweetin's representative confirmed that she and her boyfriend of one year, Morty Coyle, were expecting a baby. Their daughter Beatrix was born in 2010. Sweetin and Coyle became engaged in January 2011, and married on March 15, 2012, in Beverly Hills. Sweetin filed for legal separation from Coyle in June 2013. The divorce was finalized in September 2016.

On January 22, 2016, she announced her engagement to Justin Hodak, who, like Sweetin, is a recovering drug addict. On March 24, 2017, Sweetin announced the couple's separation, after he violated a restraining order against her. Hodak was sentenced on related charges a few weeks later.

On January 17, 2022, she announced her engagement to Mescal Wasilewski. They were married on July 30, 2022.

Substance abuse
Sweetin started drinking alcohol when she was 14 years old, shortly after Full House ended. Over parts of the next 13 years, she abused ecstasy, methamphetamine, and crack cocaine, among others, stating that she turned to drugs because she was "bored". In 2009, Sweetin wrote the memoir unSweetined, chronicling her downward spiral of alcohol and drug abuse that began with the ending of Full House. In one passage of the book, Sweetin discusses breaking into tears while addressing a crowd at Wisconsin's Marquette University while coming down from a two-day methamphetamine, cocaine, and ecstasy binge. She spoke about growing up on television and about how much her life had improved since getting sober. She says she got sober for good in December 2008. She then began working as a clinical logistics coordinator at a Los Angeles drug rehab center and completed her degree as a drug and alcohol counselor.

Sweetin became a public advocate for recovery from addiction.

Political views

Sweetin has expressed support for the Black Lives Matter movement, and she was also active with Refuse Fascism, to demand the removal of the Trump administration through nonviolent street protests.

On June 25, 2022, Sweetin was shoved to the ground by members of the Los Angeles Police Department while she was protesting for abortion rights in the wake of Dobbs v. Jackson Women's Health Organization, a U.S. Supreme Court decision that overruled Roe v. Wade  and Planned Parenthood v. Casey leading to abortion bans in multiple states. A representative for Sweetin reported that she is "OK" and the LAPD released a statement saying that the use of force would be "evaluated" to see whether it followed their policy and procedure.

Filmography

Awards and nominations

Wins
 1990: Young Artist Award for Outstanding Young Comedienne in a Television Series (Full House)
 Writers in Treatment's Experience, Strength and Hope Award

Nominations
 1988: Young Artist Award for Outstanding Young Comedienne in a Television Series (Full House)
 1989: Young Artist Award for Outstanding Young Comedienne in a Television Series (Full House)
 1991: Young Artist Award for Outstanding Young Comedienne in a Television Series (Full House)
 1993: Young Artist Award for Outstanding Young Comedienne in a Television Series (Full House)
 2004: TV Land Award for Quintessential Non-Traditional Family (Full House)

References

External links

 
 

1982 births
20th-century American actresses
21st-century American actresses
Actresses from Los Angeles
American adoptees
American child actresses
American film actresses
American podcasters
American people who self-identify as being of Native American descent
American television actresses
American women podcasters
American women television personalities
American voice actresses
Chapman University alumni
Living people
Television personalities from Los Angeles
Participants in American reality television series